Cassiano Dias Moreira (born June 16, 1989 in Porto Alegre), or simply Cassiano, is a Brazilian footballer who plays as a forward for Portuguese club Estoril.

Career

Club
In January 2017, Cassiano joined FC Aktobe on loan.

On 30 June 2017, Casino joined Grêmio.

On 4 August 2022, Cassiano joined Saudi Arabian club Al-Faisaly on a one-year deal with the option to extend for a further year.

On 26 January 2023, Cassiano joined Estoril on a one-and-a-half-year contract.

Honours
 Esportivo
 Campeonato Gaúcho Série A2: 2012

Internacional
Campeonato Gaúcho: 2013

Fortaleza
Campeonato Cearense: 2015

Goiás
Campeonato Goiano: 2016

References

External links
 
 

1989 births
Living people
Brazilian footballers
Footballers from Porto Alegre
Association football forwards
Campeonato Brasileiro Série A players
Campeonato Brasileiro Série B players
Cypriot First Division players
K League 1 players
Kazakhstan Premier League players
China League One players
Saudi First Division League players
Primeira Liga players
Esporte Clube São José players
Grêmio Esportivo Glória players
Nea Salamis Famagusta FC players
Clube Esportivo Bento Gonçalves players
Sport Club Internacional players
Criciúma Esporte Clube players
Santa Cruz Futebol Clube players
Fortaleza Esporte Clube players
Gwangju FC players
Goiás Esporte Clube players
FC Aktobe players
Grêmio Esportivo Brasil players
Boavista F.C. players
Heilongjiang Ice City F.C. players
Al-Faisaly FC players
G.D. Estoril Praia players
Brazilian expatriate footballers
Expatriate footballers in Cyprus
Expatriate footballers in South Korea
Expatriate footballers in Kazakhstan
Expatriate footballers in China
Brazilian expatriate sportspeople in China
Expatriate footballers in Saudi Arabia
Brazilian expatriate sportspeople in Saudi Arabia
Expatriate footballers in Portugal
Brazilian expatriate sportspeople in Portugal